Rico Schmitt (born 27 September 1968) is a German football manager and former player, who last managed SV Meppen.

References

External links

1968 births
Living people
Footballers from Saxony
People from Bezirk Karl-Marx-Stadt
Sportspeople from Chemnitz
Association football goalkeepers
East German footballers
German footballers
Oberliga (football) players
Chemnitzer FC players
German football managers
FC Erzgebirge Aue managers
2. Bundesliga managers
3. Liga managers
VfB Fortuna Chemnitz managers
Hallescher FC managers
VfR Aalen managers
FC Carl Zeiss Jena managers
Kickers Offenbach managers
SV Meppen managers